Artem Makavchik (born 14 July 2000) is a Belarusian professional footballer who plays for Dinamo Minsk.

Makavchik's father Vitaly Makavchik is also a former professional football goalkeeper.

References

External links 
 
 

2000 births
Living people
Belarusian footballers
Association football goalkeepers
FC Torpedo Minsk players
FC Energetik-BGU Minsk players
FC Dinamo Minsk players